Rossville is a community in Lincoln County, Oklahoma, United States, on US Highway 177. The community had a post office from October 7, 1895, until February 15, 1907. Per Oklahoma Place Names it was named for Ross Thomas, a local resident.

The community consists of a store, a church, and several residential dwellings. The Rossville School was one mile south of the community and the Rossville cemetery is one mile south and a half-mile west of the community. Many of the buildings (including the store) were relocated back from the right-of-way when US 177 was constructed during the 1960s.

Sources
Shirk, George H.; Oklahoma Place Names; University of Oklahoma Press; Norman, Oklahoma; 1987:  .

Unincorporated communities in Lincoln County, Oklahoma
Unincorporated communities in Oklahoma